Diane Cailhier (1947 – 5 February 2020) was a Canadian filmmaker and director. She was married to fellow film director Alain Chartrand.

Biography
Cailhier was born in 1947 in Salaberry-de-Valleyfield. Her father, Antonin Cailhier, was a professor at the Séminaire de Valleyfield. Her mother, Marguerite Cailhier, was the first female graduate in literary science at Pensionnat de Valleyfield.

Cailhier attended primary and secondary school at Pensionnat de Valleyfield, and did her collegiate studies at Collège Jesus-Marie d’Outremont. She obtained a Laureat in piano from École de musique Vincent-d'Indy in 1964 and studied at École des Beaux-Arts de Montréal from 1967 to 1969. Cailhier then earned a master's degree in literary art at Université de Montréal in 1975.

Her first dramatic texts were L'Atelier and Studio d'études in 1970 and 1971, which were aired on Radio-Canada and directed by Robert Blondin. She also researched and adapted novels for the program Lectures de chevet. From 1972 to 1975, Cailhier was a researcher and conducted interviews for the radio program Gens de mon pays, produced by Blondin and Jean Boisvert.

Cailhier's first feature film, La piastre, was written in 1974 and released in 1976 with her husband Alain Chartrand, shortly after the birth of their daughter, Marie.

A film professor at Collège Jean-de-Brébeuf from 1976 to 1977, Cailhier later taught at Cégep de Sherbrooke until 1986. During this time, she continued producing films, and took residence at Sainte-Catherine-de-Hatley. She gave documentary writing lessons at the Institut de l’image et du son and the Association québécoise des auteurs dramatiques. Her career in film took off in the 1980s with the writing of documentaries, TV shows, short films, and feature films.

Diane Cailhier died on 5 February 2020 at the age of 73.

Filmography
La Piastre - 1976
Les Douces - 1980
Images de L'Estrie - 1980
L'Estrie en musique - 1981
Terre et mémoire - 1983
Des amis pour la vie - 1988
Un homme de parole - 1991
Une nuit à l'école - 1991
Les intrépides - 1991
Le jardin d'Anna - 1992
Les Grands Procès - 1995
My Life Is a River (Une vie comme rivière) - 1996
Deux frères - 1999
Chartrand et Simonne - 1999
The Outlander (Le Survenant) - 2005
Lac Mystère - 2013

References

1947 births
2020 deaths
People from Montérégie
Film directors from Quebec
Canadian television directors
Canadian women film directors
French Quebecers
Canadian documentary film directors
Canadian women television directors
20th-century Canadian screenwriters
21st-century Canadian screenwriters
20th-century Canadian women writers
21st-century Canadian women writers
Canadian women screenwriters
Canadian screenwriters in French
Canadian women documentary filmmakers